Hoeks (Dutch: [ɦuks], from hoek, meaning corner) is a Dutch surname. Notable people with the surname include:

Eduard Hoeks (born 1952), Dutch diplomat
Sylvia Hoeks (born 1983), Dutch actress and model

See also
Hoek (surname)
Hooks (surname)

Dutch-language surnames